Holy Cross Cemetery is a Catholic cemetery at 5835 West Slauson Avenue in Culver City, California, operated by the Los Angeles Archdiocese.

It is partially in the Culver City city limits.

Opened in 1939, Holy Cross comprises . It contains—amongst others—the graves and tombs of showbusiness professionals. Many celebrities are in the sections near "The Grotto" in the southwest part of the cemetery.

Notable Burials

A
 Gypsy Abbott (1896–1952), actress
 Jean Acker (1893–1978), actress, first wife of Rudolph Valentino
 Frank Albertson (1909–1964), actor
 Sara Allgood (1879–1950), actress
 Cecilia Alvear (1939–2017), journalist
 Ramsay Ames (1919–1998), actress
 Tod Andrews (1914–1972), actor
 Richard Arlen (1899–1976), actor
 Henry Armetta (1888–1945), actor
 Mary Astor (1906–1987), actress

B
 Fred Baczewski (1926–1976), Major League Baseball player
 Joan Banks (1918–1998), actress
 Sam Barry (1892–1950), Hall of Fame basketball coach
 John Beradino (1917–1996), actor, Major League Baseball player
 Johnny Bero (1922–1985), Major League Baseball player
 Sally Blane (1910–1997), actress
 Alfred S. Bloomingdale (1916–1982), department store heir, had affair with model Vicki Morgan, a murder victim
 Betsy N. Bloomingdale (1922–2016), widow of Alfred Bloomingdale, socialite and author
 Joseph Bodner (1925–1982), American illustrator and painter
 Roman Bohnen (1901–1949), actor
 Ray Bolger (1904–1987), actor and dancer best known for his role of The Scarecrow in The Wizard of Oz
 Fortunio Bonanova (1895–1969), actor
 Charles Boyer (1899–1978), actor
 Scott Brady (1924–1985), actor
 Keefe Brasselle (1923–1981), actor, producer and writer
 Joseph Breen (1890–1965), former head of the Production Code Administration
 Argentina Brunetti (1907–2005), actress
 Sonny Burke (1914–1980), bandleader, composer, arranger, and record producer
 Daws Butler (1916–1988), actor and voice-over artist best known for voicing Huckleberry Hound, Yogi Bear, Quick Draw McGraw, Snagglepuss, and others

C
 John Candy (1950–1994), actor and comedian
 Macdonald Carey (1913–1994), actor
 Walter Catlett (1889–1960), actor
 Hobart Cavanaugh (1886–1950), actor
 Marguerite Chapman (1918–1999), actress
 D. Worth Clark (1902–1955), U.S. Senator (1939–1945) from Idaho
 Ruth Clifford (1900–1998), actress
 Bill Cody (1891–1948), actor
 Pinto Colvig (1892–1967), actor and voice-over artist
 Joe Connelly (1917–2003), television writer and producer
 Jackie Coogan (1914–1984), actor
 Charles Correll (1890–1972), actor and comedian
 Jeanne Coyne (1923–1973), actress, dancer and choreographer
 Darby Crash (1958–1980), musician
 Bing Crosby (1903–1977), actor and singer (Father of Dennis, Lindsay, Phillip Crosby)
 Dennis Crosby (1934–1991), actor and singer (Son of Bing Crosby)
 Lindsay Crosby (1938–1989), actor and singer (Son of Bing Crosby)
 Phillip Crosby (1934–2004), actor and singer (Son of Bing Crosby)
 Leo Cullum (1942–2010), cartoonist
 Dick Curtis (1902–1952), actor

D
 Mona Darkfeather (1883–1977), actress
 Joan Davis (1907–1961), actress and comedian
 Virginia Davis (1918–2009), child actress
 Bobby Day (1928–1990), singer
 Dennis Day (1916–1988), actor, singer and comedian
 Pedro de Cordoba (1881–1950), actor
 Fred de Cordova (1910–2001), director and producer
 Eadie Del Rubio (1921–1996), musician
 Elena Del Rubio (1921–2001), musician
 Milly Del Rubio (1921–2011), musician
 Jean Del Val (1891–1975), actor
 Ralph DePalma (1892–1956), champion racecar driver, won 1915 Indianapolis 500, inducted into International Motorsports Hall of Fame in 1991
 Johnny Desmond (1919–1985), actor and singer
 John Doucette (1921–1994), actor
 Constance Dowling (1920–1969), actress
 Doris Dowling (1923–2004), actress
 William Dozier (1908–1991), producer best known for creating the TV series Batman
 Tom Drake (1918–1982), actor
 Al Dubin (1891–1945), songwriter
 Jimmy Durante (1893–1980), actor and comedian
 Mervyn Dymally (1926–2012), former Lieutenant Governor of California and U.S. Congressman from California.

E
 Vince Edwards (1928–1996), actor
 Richard Egan (1921–1987), actor

F
 John Fante  (1909–1983), novelist, short-story and screenwriter.
 John Farrow (1904–1963), director, husband of actress Maureen O'Sullivan, father of actress Mia Farrow
 Emily Fitzroy (1860–1954), actress
 James Flavin (1906–1976), actor
 Joe Flynn (1924–1974), actor and comedian
 George J. Folsey (1898–1988), cinematographer
 Francis Ford (1881–1959), actor, writer and director
 John Ford (1894–1974), director
 Wallace Ford (1898–1966), actor
 Victoria Forde (1896–1964), actress
 Norman Foster (1900–1976), actor and director
 Gene Fowler (1890–1960), writer
 Mary Frann (1943–1998), actress
 Thelma Furness, Viscountess Furness (1904–1970) twin sister of Gloria Morgan Vanderbilt

G
 Richard "Skeets" Gallagher (1891–1955), actor
 William Garity (1899–1971), sound engineer
 Pauline Garon (1900–1965), actress
 Mike Gazella (1895–1978), MLB player
 Charles Gemora (1903–1961), actor and stuntman
 Margaret Gibson (1894–1964), actress
 Gaston Glass (1899–1965), actor
 James Gleason (1882–1959), actor
 Dedrick D. Gobert (1971–1994), actor
 Jose Gonzales-Gonzales (1922–2000), actor
 Pedro Gonzalez-Gonzalez (1925–2006), actor
 Bonita Granville (1923–1988), actress
 Gilda Gray (1901–1959), actress and dancer
 Robert Greig (1879–1958), actor
 Fathia Ghali (1930–1976), princess of Egypt

H
 Jack Haley (1898–1979), actor and comedian best known for his role of The Tin Man in The Wizard of Oz
 Jack Haley, Jr. (1933–2001), director, producer and writer
 Joe Hamilton (1929–1991), producer
 Kipp Hamilton (1934–1981), actress
 Fred Haney (1898–1977), MLB player and manager
 Juanita Hansen (1895–1961), actress
 Neal Hart, actor and director
 Henry Hathaway (1898–1985), director and producer
 June Haver (1926–2005), actress
 Allison Hayes (1930–1977), actress
 Rita Hayworth (1918–1987), actress and dancer
 Chick Hearn (1916–2002), sports broadcaster
 Emmaline Henry (1928–1979), actress
 Hugh Herbert (1887–1952), actor and comedian
 Dwayne Hickman (1934–2022), actor
 Conrad Hilton, Jr. (1926–1969), business executive and TWA director, heir of Hilton Hotel chain
 Taylor Holmes (1878–1959), actor
 Stan Hough (1918–1990), former vice-president of 20th Century Fox

I
 Earl Michael Irving (1953–2022), diplomat
 Amparo Iturbi (1899–1969), composer and concert pianist
 José Iturbi (1895–1980), composer and concert pianist

J
 Rita Johnson (1913–1965), actress
 Spike Jones (1911–1965), musician and comedian
 Jim Jordan (1896–1988), actor and comedian
 Marian Jordan (1898–1961), actress and comedian

K
 Herbert Kalmus (1881–1963), co-inventor of Technicolor
 Robert Keith (1898–1966), actor
 Paul Kelly (1899–1956), actor
 Charles Kemper (1900–1950), actor
 Edgar Kennedy (1890–1948), actor and comedian
 J. M. Kerrigan (1884–1964), actor
 Norman Kerry (1894–1956), actor
 Cammie King (1934–2010), child actress
 Henry King (1886–1982), director
 James Kirkwood, Sr. (1875–1963), actor and director
 Helen Kleeb (1907–2003), actress

L
 Jack La Rue (1902–1984), actor
 Sir Lancelot (1902–2001), singer
 Mario Lanza (1921–1959), actor and singer
 Eddie Laughton (1903–1952), actor
 Tim Layana (1964–1999), MLB pitcher
 Dorothy Leavey (1897–1998), philanthropist.
 Dixie Lee (1909–1952) actress, dancer and singer (Bing Crosby's first wife)
 Jimmy Lennon (1913–1992), sports announcer
 Joan Leslie (1925-2015), actress
 Nick Licata (1897–1974), mobster
 Margaret Lindsay (1910–1981), actress
 David Lloyd (1934–2009), screenwriter
 Gene Lockhart (1891–1957), actor
 Kathleen Lockhart (1894–1978), actress
 Ella Logan (1913–1969), actress and singer
 Frank Lovejoy (1912–1962), actor
 Peanuts Lowrey (1917–1986), MLB outfielder
 Bela Lugosi (1882–1956), actor
 William Lundigan (1914–1975), actor

M
 Donald MacBride (1889–1957), actor
 Ranald MacDougall (1915–1973), screenwriter
 Fred MacMurray (1908–1991), actor
 Gene Mako (1916–2013), tennis player
 Effa Manley (1897–1981), owner of Newark Eagles
 Eddie Mannix (1891–1963), movie studio executive
 Toni Mannix (1906–1983), wife of Eddie Mannix
 George Marshall (1891–1975), director
 Harry Martin (1889–1951), medical director of 20th Century Fox Studios and third husband of Louella Parsons
 Marion Martin (1909–1985), actress
 Alfredo Ramos Martínez (1871–1946), artist, educator
 Al Martino (1927–2009), singer
 Rudolph Maté (1898–1964), cinematographer and director
 May McAvoy (1899–1984), actress
 Leo McCarey (1898–1969), director
 Christine McIntyre (1911–1984), actress
 David McLean (1922–1995), actor
 Stephen McNally (1913–1994), actor
 Audrey Meadows (1922–1996), actress
 Ann Miller (1923–2004), actress, singer, dancer
 Millard Mitchell (1903–1953), actor
 James V. Monaco (1885–1945), composer
 Ricardo Montalbán (1920–2009), actor
 Carlotta Monti (1907–1993), actress
 Thelma Morgan (1904–1970), socialite, twin sister of Gloria Morgan Vanderbilt, aunt of fashion designer Gloria Vanderbilt
 James C. Morton (1884–1942), actor
 Alan Mowbray (1896–1969), actor
 Jack Mulhall (1887–1979), actor
 Richard Murphy (1912–1993), screenwriter, director and producer
 Jim Murray (1919–1998), sportswriter

N
 Anne Nagel (1915–1966), actress
 Reggie Nalder (1907–1991), actor
 Grete Natzler (1906–1999), actress and singer
 Evelyn Nesbit (1884–1967), actress
 Fred C. Newmeyer (1881–1967), director

O
 Edmond O'Brien (1915–1985), actor
 Pat O'Brien (1899–1983), actor
 Helen O'Connell (1920–1993), singer
 Rod O'Connor (1914–1964), announcer
 Walter O'Malley (1903–1979), baseball executive, owner of the Los Angeles Dodgers
 Barney Oldfield (1878–1946), race car driver, actor
 Kid Ory (1886–1973), trombonist and bandleader, Dixieland jazz

P
 Robert Paige (1911–1987), actor
 George Pal (1908–1980), director, producer and animator
 Erv Palica (1928–1982), MLB pitcher
 Hermes Pan (1910–1990), choreographer and dancer
 Louella Parsons (1881–1972), writer and columnist
 Marty Pasetta (1932–2015), television producer and director
 Pat Paterson (1910–1978), actress
 Chris Penn (1965–2006), actor
 Leo Penn (1921–1998), actor and director
 Jean Peters (1926–2000), actress
 ZaSu Pitts (1894–1963), actress and comedian
 John Polich (1916–2001), NHL player
 Paul Porcasi (1879–1946), actor
 Jerry Priddy (1919–1980), MLB second baseman
 Dick Purcell (1908–1944), actor

R

 Rosa Raisa (1893–1963), opera singer
 Alejandro Rey (1930–1987), actor
 Kane Richmond (1906–1973), actor
 Hayden Rorke (1910–1987), actor
 Rip Russell (1915–1976), MLB infielder and outfielder
 Rosalind Russell (1907–1976), actress
 Faiza Rauf (1923–1994) princess of Egypt

S
 Nazli Sabri (1894–1978), former Queen consort of Egypt.
 Gia Scala (1934–1972), actress
 Fred F. Sears (1913–1957), actor and director
 Dorothy Sebastian (1903–1957), actress
 Edward Sedgwick (1889–1953), actor, director, screenwriter, and producer
 Miriam Seegar (1907–2011), actress
 John F. Seitz (1892–1979), cinematographer and inventor.
 Mack Sennett (1880–1960), mogul
 Frank Shannon (1874–1959), actor
 Diane Sherbloom (1942–1961), figure skater
 Margarita Sierra (1936–1963), singer and actress
 Robert Six (1907–1986), former CEO of Continental Airlines
 Miriam Snitzer (1922–1966), actress
 Manuel Sorola (1880–1957), first Hispanic FBI agent.
 Jo Stafford (1917–2008), singer
 Harry Stradling (1901–1970), cinematographer
 Edmund Sylvers (1957–2004), singer

T
 Doris Tate (1924–1992), anti-parole activist, mother of Sharon Tate
 Sharon Tate (1943–1969), actress murdered by the Manson family
 Dallas Taylor (1948–2015), drummer
 Ray Teal (1902–1976), actor
 Dewey Terry (1938–2003), musician
 George Trafton (1896–1971), NFL player

V
 Joseph A. Valentine (1900–1949), cinematographer
 Mabel Van Buren (1878–1947), actress
 Gloria Morgan Vanderbilt (1904–1965), socialite, twin sister of Thelma Morgan, mother of fashion designer Gloria Vanderbilt
 Joe Viterelli (1937–2004), actor

W
 Geraldine Wall (1912–1970), actress
 Robert Warwick (1878–1964), actor
 Bryant Washburn (1889–1963), actor
 Ned Washington (1901–1976), songwriter
 Bernie Wayne (1919–1993), songwriter
 Lawrence Welk (1903–1992), musician
 Paul Weston (1912–1996), bandleader, arranger and composer
 Tim Whelan (1893–1957), director and screenwriter
 William R. Wilkerson (1890–1962), founder of The Hollywood Reporter, Flamingo Hotel and owner of such nightclubs as Ciro's
 Mary Wilson (1944-2021), singer; founding member of The Supremes
 Paula Winslowe (1910–1996), actress
 Jack Wrather (1918–1984), investor

Y
 Georgiana Young (1923–2007), actress
 Loretta Young (1913–2000), actress
 Polly Ann Young (1908–1997), actress

See also
 Holy Cross Cemetery, Colma

References

External links

 

Cemeteries in Los Angeles County, California
Buildings and structures in Culver City, California
Roman Catholic cemeteries in California
Roman Catholic Archdiocese of Los Angeles
Baldwin Hills (mountain range)
1939 establishments in California